State Route 73 (abbreviated SR 73) is part of Maine's system of numbered state highways, a coastal route located in southern Knox County.

Route description
SR 73 runs roughly parallel to SR 131 on the coastline, passing through the towns of South Thomaston and Owls Head without any major junctions. SR 73 crosses into Rockland and proceeds due north into the town center, where it ends at US 1.

SR 73 is known as Seal Harbor Road in St. George, Spruce Head Road in Spruce Head, Elm Street in South Thomaston, and Weskeag Road, Ingraham Drive and South Main Street in Rockland. Knox County Regional Airport is located along SR 73 in Owls Head.

Junction list

References

External links

Floodgap Roadgap's RoadsAroundME: Maine State Route 73

073
Transportation in Knox County, Maine